Yuri Ivanovich Morozov (31 March 1938 – 26 May 2022) was a ice hockey player who played in the Soviet Hockey League. He was born in Moscow, and played for Khimik Moscow Oblast. He was inducted into the Russian and Soviet Hockey Hall of Fame in 1970.

References

External links
 Russian and Soviet Hockey Hall of Fame bio

1938 births
2022 deaths
Soviet ice hockey players
Soviet ice hockey coaches
Ice hockey people from Moscow
HC Khimik Voskresensk players
Honoured Masters of Sport of the USSR
Honoured Coaches of Russia